The buff-chested babbler (Cyanoderma ambiguum) is a species of bird in the Old World babbler family. It is found in south-eastern Asia from the eastern Himalayas to southern Laos.

References

Collar, N. J. & Robson, C. 2007. Family Timaliidae (Babblers)  pp. 70–291 in; del Hoyo, J., Elliott, A. & Christie, D.A. eds. Handbook of the Birds of the World, Vol. 12. Picathartes to Tits and Chickadees. Lynx Edicions, Barcelona.

buff-chested babbler
Birds of Eastern Himalaya
Birds of Southeast Asia
Birds of Yunnan
buff-chested babbler
Taxonomy articles created by Polbot
Taxobox binomials not recognized by IUCN